Gabriel Brownlow-Dindy (born c. 2003) is an American football defensive tackle for the Texas A&M Aggies.

Brownlow-Dindy played high school football at Lakeland High School in Lakeland, Florida. He was rated by ESPN as the No. 3 football recruit in the 2022 recruiting class. He was also rated No. 8 nationally by 247Sports.

Brownlow-Dindy initially committed to play college football for Oklahoma. In January 2022, he withdrew his commitment to Oklahoma and instead committed to Texas A&M. He was part of a recruiting class at Texas A&M that is rated as the best in the history of recruiting rankings.

References

External links
 Texas A&M bio

Living people
American football defensive tackles
Texas A&M Aggies football players
Players of American football from Florida
Year of birth missing (living people)